Mount Bauerman is a mountain in Waterton Lakes National Park, Alberta, Canada.

Mount Bauerman has the name of H. Bauerman, a government geologist.

References

Two-thousanders of Alberta
Waterton Lakes National Park
Canadian Rockies